Dylan Bluestone (born 8 January 1997 in Morristown, New Jersey) is an American child actor. He is most famous for the role of Daniel Hughes, Emily Stewart and Tom Hughes's son on the soap opera As the World Turns.

Early career
Dylan started his career at age 2, when he started doing shtick in his family's living room. Then, at age 3, he landed the part of Daniel Hughes, on As the World Turns, and other TV shows, including Law & Order: SVU.

Filmography

Films
Loverboy (2005) as Bully
Remember Back, Remember When (2007 short) a Forest
When in Rome (2010) as Bad-Mouthed Kid in a park

Television
Elmo's World: Unknown episode (probably 2000) as Unknown
As the World Turns (2001-2006) as Daniel Hughes
Law & Order: SVU: Coerced (2003) as Adam Forbes
The Naked Brothers Band: The County Fair (2008) as Harley
Mayne Street (2009) as Little Boy
BMW (2009 web series) as Unknown

Theater
Henry IV as Young Prince Henry IV/Petitioner 2/Clerk/Prince Edward
Gareth & Lynette as Gareth

References

External links

1998 births
Living people
American male child actors
21st-century American male actors